Rachid Peter Harkouk (born 19 May 1956) is a former professional footballer. Born in England, he represented the Algeria national team at international level.

International career
Harkouk was born in England to an Algerian father and English mother of Welsh descent. He appeared for Algeria at the 1986 FIFA World Cup, coming on as a substitute for Rabah Madjer in their opening game against Northern Ireland. He did not feature against Brazil but was the lone striker against Spain. During that game he sustained a knee injury that ended his career.

Personal life
After his retirement from football Harkouk became a businessman in the village of Burton Joyce. In August 2011, he was jailed for 28 months for conspiring to supply illegal drugs.

Career statistics

Club

Hat-trick

Honours 
 Anglo-Scottish Cup runner-up: 1980–81
 Second Division runner-up: 1980–81

References

External links
international stats
biography

1956 births
Living people
Algerian people of English descent
English people of Algerian descent
Algerian footballers
English footballers
Footballers from Chelsea, London
Association football forwards
Algeria international footballers
English Football League players
1986 FIFA World Cup players
Crystal Palace F.C. players
Notts County F.C. players
Queens Park Rangers F.C. players
Feltham F.C. (1946) players
Chertsey Town F.C. players